Jean-François Blassel (born April 18, 1956), is a French architect of bridges, Viaducts, and railway bridges.

Places of activity 
 Renzo Piano Building Workshop
 RFR Engineers

Works and achievements 

 Non exhaustive list 	
 Hell jernbanebru, railway bridge, Hell, Norway (2016).

References

See also

Bibliography 
 "Viaducts on the Rhone at Avignon" in "Forms and Structure", No. 127, p. 41
 "Design and Construction of St. Patrick's Pedestrian Bridge in Calgary" presented during "Footbridge 2014 - Past, Present & Future", London, July 16–18, 2014.
 'Glas - Haut und Oberfläche' in  Detail - Zeitschrift für Architektur + Baudetail , n ° 3, vol. 38, p. 320, 1998
 "The station of Strasbourg" in "Metal Construction", n ° 1, pp. 15–36, 2008

Related Articles 
 Gare d'Avignon TGV
 Gare de Belfort - Montbéliard TGV
 Léon-Blum Viaduct

External links 

Living people
1956 births
20th-century French architects
21st-century French architects